Poortmannia is a genus of flowering plants belonging to the family Solanaceae. It is also in Solanoideae subfamily, tribe Solandreae Miers and also subtribe Juanulloinae. The genus has only one known species, Poortmannia speciosa .

Its native range is tropical South America and it is found in the countries of Colombia, Ecuador and Peru.

Description
They are epiphytic shrubs, root-climbing lianas or small trees. It has cylindrical stems with verrucose bark.
The petiole (leaf stalk) is short and stout. The inflorescence are axillary with few flowered cymes. The pedicels (flower stalk) are shorter than the peduncles.
The flowers are pendant-like, large, 5-merous, with valvate aestivation. The calyx is green, purplish tinged, campanulate (bell shaped), 5-keeled, lobes coriaceous, deltoid or lanceolate, free half way to near the base. The stamens are slightly exserted and the filaments are ciliate, enlarged at base, inserted
near the base of corolla, connivent around the straight style. The anthers are oblong, dorsifixed near the base.
The nectary is fleshy and the ovary is 5-carpellate, 10-locular. The stigma is clavate and 5-lobed. The fruit (or seed capsule) is a large berry surrounded by the accrescent calyx. Inside the capsule, it has numerous elongated reniform seeds.

Taxonomy
The genus name of Poortmannia is in honour of Hugo Anne Cornelis Poortman (1858–1953), Dutch garden architect; collected plants in Colombia and Ecuador; created various manor and castle gardens. The Latin specific epithet of speciosa means showy. Both the genus and the species were first described and published in Bull. Annuel Soc. Philom. Paris, séries 8, Vol.4 on page 128 in 1892.

The genus is not recognized by the United States Department of Agriculture and the Agricultural Research Service, as they class it as a synonym of Trianaea . As well as a few other sources, although a recent phylogenetic study by Orejuela et al., (2017) recognizes it as a distinct genus based on DNA sequences.

References

Solanaceae
Monotypic Solanaceae genera
Plants described in 1892
Flora of Colombia
Flora of Ecuador
Flora of Peru